Major Henry Gorell Barnes, 2nd Baron Gorell, DSO, (21 January 1882 – 16 January 1917) was a barrister and an officer in the Territorial Force. He served on the Western Front in World War I where he was mortally wounded.

Education and legal career
He was born in 1882, the eldest son of John Barnes, 1st Baron Gorell. After an education at Winchester, Trinity College, Oxford (MA 1908), and Harvard, he was called to the Bar by the Inner Temple in 1906. He worked as a secretary to his father when he was on the Bench, and later as secretary of the Royal Commission on Divorce. He succeeded his father in the peerage in 1913. He was a very active English Freemason, and a member of Oxford's Apollo University Lodge.

Military career and death
Gorell was a pre-war officer in the part-time Territorial Force, having been commissioned as a second lieutenant in the 18th County of London Battery, 7th County of London Brigade, Royal Field Artillery, on 2 September 1909. He was promoted to captain on 19 April 1912, and on the outbreak of World War I he was acting commander of 19th County of London Battery detached at Shepherd's Bush. He went with his battery to the Western Front where he commanded it as a Temporary major. When the infantry of 47th (1/2nd London) Division succeeded in capturing High Wood on the Somme after bitter fighting on 15 September 1916, the first gun battery to come up in support across the deeply-cratered ground was Gorell's. He later made a dangerous reconnaissance of the whole divisional front. For these actions he was awarded the Distinguished Service Order.

On 15 January 1917, while serving in the Ypres Salient, Gorell was returning from observing for his battery in the front line when he was mortally wounded by an enemy shell in a communication trench. 'A pre-war Territorial officer of high professional attainments, and at times almost reckless courage, his loss was universally mourned'. He died the next day, having served one year and ten month's continuous service abroad. He is buried at Lijssenthoek Military Cemetery near Poperinge, West Flanders, Belgium.

The 2nd Baron Gorell was succeeded in the peerage by his younger brother, Ronald.

See also
Baron Gorell

Notes

References
 The Annual Register: a review of public events at home and abroad, for the year 1917. London: Longmans, Green and Co. 1918.
 Burke's Peerage, Baronetage and Knightage, 100th Edn, London, 1953
 Commonwealth War Graves Commission
 
 London Gazette
 Alan H. Maude (ed.), The History of the 47th (London) Division 1914–1919, London: Amalgamated Press, 1922/Uckfield: Naval & Military Press, 2002, .
 Monthly Army List.

1882 births
1917 deaths
British Army personnel of World War I
British military personnel killed in World War I
Royal Field Artillery officers
Members of the Inner Temple
Harvard University alumni
Companions of the Distinguished Service Order
Barons in the Peerage of the United Kingdom
People educated at Winchester College
Alumni of Trinity College, Oxford
Burials at Lijssenthoek Military Cemetery
Territorial Force officers